Alginic acid, also called algin, is a naturally occurring, edible polysaccharide found in brown algae.  It is hydrophilic and forms a viscous gum when hydrated. With metals such as sodium and calcium, its salts are known as alginates. Its colour ranges from white to yellowish-brown. It is sold in filamentous, granular, or powdered forms. 

It is a significant component of the biofilms produced by the bacterium Pseudomonas aeruginosa, a major pathogen found in the lungs of some people who have cystic fibrosis. The biofilm and P. aeruginosa have a high resistance to antibiotics, but susceptible to inhibition by macrophages.

Structure
Alginic acid is a linear copolymer with homopolymeric blocks of (1→4)-linked β-D-mannuronate (M) and α-L-guluronate (G) residues, respectively, covalently linked together in different sequences or blocks. The monomers may appear in homopolymeric blocks of consecutive G-residues (G-blocks), consecutive M-residues (M-blocks) or alternating M and G-residues (MG-blocks). α-L-guluronate is the C-5 epimer of β-D-mannuronate.

Forms
Alginates are refined from brown seaweeds. Throughout the world, many of the Phaeophyceae class brown seaweeds are harvested to be processed and converted into sodium alginate. Sodium alginate is used in many industries including food, animal food, fertilisers, textile printing, and pharmaceuticals. Dental impression material uses alginate as its means of gelling. Food grade alginate is an approved ingredient in processed and manufactured foods.

Brown seaweeds range in size from the giant kelp Macrocystis pyrifera  which can be 20–40 meters long, to thick, leather-like seaweeds from 2–4 m long, to smaller species 30–60 cm long.  Most brown seaweed used for alginates are gathered from the wild, with the exception of Laminaria japonica, which is cultivated in China for food and its surplus material is diverted to the alginate industry in China.

Alginates from different species of brown seaweed vary in their chemical structure resulting in different physical properties of alginates. Some species yield an alginate that gives a strong gel, another a weaker gel, some may produce a cream or white alginate, while others are difficult to gel and are best used for technical applications where color does not matter.

Commercial grade alginate are extracted from giant kelp Macrocystis pyrifera, Ascophyllum nodosum, and types of Laminaria. Alginates are also produced by two bacterial genera Pseudomonas and Azotobacter, which played a major role in the unravelling of its biosynthesis pathway. Bacterial alginates are useful for the production of micro- or nanostructures suitable for medical applications.

Sodium alginate (NaC6H7O6) is the sodium salt of alginic acid. Sodium alginate is a gum.

Potassium alginate (KC6H7O6) is the potassium salt of alginic acid.

Calcium alginate (CaC12H14O12), is made from sodium alginate from which the sodium ion has been removed and replaced with calcium (ion exchange).

Production
The manufacturing process used to extract sodium alginates from brown seaweed fall into two categories: 1) calcium alginate method and, 2) alginic acid method.

Chemically the process is simple, but difficulties arise from the physical separations required between the slimy residues from viscous solutions and the separation of gelatinous precipitates that hold large amounts of liquid within their structure, so they resist filtration and centrifugation.

Uses

Alginate absorbs water quickly, which makes it useful as an additive in dehydrated products such as slimming aids, and in the manufacture of paper and textiles. It is also used for waterproofing and fireproofing fabrics, in the food industry as a thickening agent for drinks, ice cream, cosmetics, and as a gelling agent for jellies, known by the code E401. Sodium alginate is mixed with soybean flour to make meat analogue.

Alginate is used as an ingredient in various pharmaceutical preparations, such as Gaviscon, in which it combines with bicarbonate to inhibit gastroesophageal reflux. Sodium alginate is used as an impression-making material in dentistry, prosthetics, lifecasting, and for creating positives for small-scale casting.

Sodium alginate is used in reactive dye printing and as a thickener for reactive dyes in textile screen-printing. Alginates do not react with these dyes and wash out easily, unlike starch-based thickeners. It also serves as a material for micro-encapsulation.

Calcium alginate is used in different types of medical products, including skin wound dressings to promote healing, and may be removed with less pain than conventional dressings.

Alginate hydrogels

Alginate may be used in a hydrogel consisting of microparticles or bulk gels combined with nerve growth factor in bioengineering research to stimulate brain tissue for possible regeneration. In research on bone reconstruction, alginate composites have favorable properties encouraging regeneration, such as improved porosity, cell proliferation, and mechanical strength, among other characteristics.

Alginate hydrogel is a common biomaterial for bio-fabrication of scaffolds and tissue regeneration.

See also
 Hyaluronic acid: a polysaccharide in animals.
 Agar

References

External links
 Alginate seaweed sources
 Alginate properties

Polysaccharides
Natural gums
Edible thickening agents
Copolymers
Dental materials
Excipients
Algal food ingredients
Brown algae
Food stabilizers
E-number additives